Poa bolanderi is a species of grass known by the common name Bolander's bluegrass.  It is native to western North America from British Columbia to Utah to California, where it is a resident of mountain habitat, particularly pine and fir forests. It is an annual grass growing in clumps up to 60 centimeters tall.  The inflorescence occupies the top 10 to 15 centimeters of the stem.  It is narrow in flower, with branches appressed, growing parallel to the stem.  As the fruit develops the branches spread out, becoming perpendicular to the stem, nodding, or drooping.  The branches have few, sparse spikelets.

Poa bolanderi commemorates Henry Nicholas Bolander, who collected the type specimen in present-day Yosemite National Park in 1866.

External links
 Jepson Manual Treatment
 USDA Plants Profile
 Grass Manual Treatment

bolanderi